Calculations in the Newman–Penrose (NP) formalism of general relativity normally begin with the construction of a complex null tetrad , where  is a pair of real null vectors and  is a pair of complex null vectors. These tetrad vectors respect the following normalization and metric conditions assuming the spacetime signature 

Only after the tetrad  gets constructed can one move forward to compute the directional derivatives, spin coefficients, commutators, Weyl-NP scalars , Ricci-NP scalars  and Maxwell-NP scalars  and other quantities in NP formalism. There are three most commonly used methods to construct a complex null tetrad:

 All four tetrad vectors are nonholonomic combinations of orthonormal holonomic tetrads;
 A tetrad which is adapted to the spacetime structure from a 3+1 perspective, with its general form being assumed and tetrad functions therein to be solved.

In the context below, it will be shown how these three methods work.

Nonholonomic tetrad

The primary method to construct a complex null tetrad is via combinations of orthonormal bases. For a spacetime  with an orthonormal tetrad ,

the covectors  of the nonholonomic complex null tetrad can be constructed by

and the tetrad vectors  can be obtained by raising the indices of  via the inverse metric .

Remark: The nonholonomic construction is actually in accordance with the local light cone structure.

Example: A nonholonomic tetrad

Given a spacetime metric of the form (in signature(-,+,+,+))

the nonholonomic orthonormal covectors are therefore

and the nonholonomic null covectors are therefore

la (na) aligned with null radial geodesics

In Minkowski spacetime, the nonholonomically constructed null vectors  respectively match the outgoing and ingoing null radial rays. As an extension of this idea in generic curved spacetimes,   can still be aligned with the tangent vector field of null radial congruence.

Example: Null tetrad for Schwarzschild metric in Eddington-Finkelstein coordinates reads

so the Lagrangian for null radial geodesics of the Schwarzschild spacetime is

which has an ingoing solution  and an outgoing solution . Now, one can construct a complex null tetrad which is adapted to the ingoing null radial geodesics:

and the dual basis covectors are therefore

Also, the remaining two tetrad (co)vectors are constructed nonholonomically. With the tetrad defined, one is now able to respectively find out the spin coefficients, Weyl-Np scalars and Ricci-NP scalars that

Example: Null tetrad for extremal Reissner–Nordström metric in Eddington-Finkelstein coordinates reads

so the Lagrangian is

and therefore the tetrad for an ingoing observer can be set up as 

With the tetrad defined, we are now able to work out the spin coefficients, Weyl-NP scalars and Ricci-NP scalars that

Tetrads adapted to the spacetime structure

At some typical boundary regions such as null infinity, timelike infinity, spacelike infinity, black hole horizons and cosmological horizons,  null tetrads adapted to spacetime structures are usually employed to achieve the most succinct Newman–Penrose descriptions.

Newman-Unti tetrad for null infinity

For null infinity, the classic Newman-Unti (NU) tetrad is employed to study asymptotic behaviors at null infinity,

where  are tetrad functions to be solved. The coordinates  comprise two real affine coordinates  and two complex stereographic coordinates , where  are the usual spherical coordinates on the cross-section  (as shown in ref., complex stereographic rather than real isothermal coordinates are used just for the convenience of completely solving NP equations).

Also, for the NU tetrad, the basic gauge conditions  are

Adapted tetrad for exteriors and near-horizon vicinity of isolated horizons 

For a more comprehensive view of black holes in quasilocal definitions, adapted tetrads which can be smoothly transited from the exterior to the near-horizon vicinity and to the horizons are required. For example, for isolated horizons describing black holes in equilibrium with their exteriors, such a tetrad and the related coordinates can be constructed this way. Choose the first real null covector  as the gradient of foliation leaves

where  is the ingoing (retarded) Eddington–Finkelstein-type null coordinate, which labels the foliation cross-sections and acts as an affine parameter with regard to the outgoing null vector field , i.e.

Introduce the second coordinate  as an affine parameter along the ingoing null vector field , which obeys the normalization

Now, the first real null tetrad vector  is fixed. To determine the remaining tetrad vectors  and their covectors, besides the basic cross-normalization conditions, it is also required that: (i) the outgoing null normal field   acts as the null generators; (ii) the null frame (covectors)  are parallelly propagated along ; (iii)  spans  the {t=constant, r=constant} cross-sections  which are labeled by real isothermal coordinates .

Tetrads satisfying the above restrictions can be expressed in the general form that

The gauge conditions in this tetrad are

Remark: Unlike Schwarzschild-type coordinates, here r=0 represents the horizon, while r>0 (r<0) corresponds to the exterior (interior) of an isolated horizon.  People often Taylor expand a scalar   function  with respect to the horizon r=0,

where  refers to its on-horizon value. The very coordinates used in the adapted tetrad above are actually the Gaussian null coordinates employed in studying near-horizon geometry and mechanics of black holes.

See also
Newman–Penrose formalism

References

General relativity
Mathematical methods in general relativity